Glen Alpine Dam is a combined gravity and earth-fill type dam located on the Mogalakwena River, near Ga-Mankgodi, Bochum Limpopo, South Africa. It was established in 1968 and its main purpose is for irrigation use. The hazard potential of the dam has been ranked as high (3).

See also
List of reservoirs and dams in South Africa
List of rivers of South Africa

References 

 List of South African Dams from the Department of Water Affairs and Forestry (South Africa)

Dams in South Africa
Mogalakwena River
Dams completed in 1968